Dirty Work may refer to:

Films and television 
Dirty Work (1933 film), an American comedy short starring comic duo Laurel and Hardy
Dirty Work (1934 film), a British comedy film
Dirty Work, a 1992 made for TV crime film starring John Ashton
Dirty Work (1998 film), an American comedy film starring Norm Macdonald and Artie Lange
Dirty Work (TV series), a 2012 television series

Music 
"Dirty Work" (Steely Dan song), 1972
Dirty Work (The Rolling Stones album), 1986
Dirty Work (All Time Low album), 2011
"Dirty Work" (Austin Mahone song), 2015
Dirty Work – The Album, a 2017 album by Austin Mahone
Derty Werk, 1999 album by T.W.D.Y.
 "Dirty Work", a song by Halestorm from the album Halestorm

Novels 
Dirty Work (Cox novel), a 1987 novel by Nigel Cox
Dirty Work (Brown novel), a 1989 novel by Larry Brown
Dirty Work, a 1993 novel by Dan McGirt
Dirty Work, a 2003 novel by Stuart Woods

Play
Dirty Work (play), farce by Ben Travers, produced in 1932 at the Aldwych Theatre, London

Other 
Dirty work, another name for chore division, a part of the theory of fair division
Dirty Work, a story from The Railway Series' book "Duck and the Diesel Engine"